The Pratt knot is a method of tying a necktie. It is also known as the Shelby knot and the Pratt-Shelby.
The knot was created by Jerry Pratt, an employee of the US Chamber of Commerce in the late 1950s. It was popularized as the Shelby knot after then 92-year-old Pratt taught it in 1986 to television reporter Don Shelby who he felt had been tying his tie poorly on the air. Shelby then refined the Pratt knot with local clothier Kingford Bavender and wore it on the air with a spread collar where it stood out and attracted attention for its symmetry and trim precision.

The knot was considered revelatory although strictly speaking it is a variation on the Nicky knot, notable for being tied inside out. As of its popularization in a 1989 New York Times article as well as subsequent UK profile the knot was unknown within the fashion world and not recorded in the tie industry's standard reference guide of the time; Getting Knotted – 188 Knots for Necks, by Davide Mosconi and Riccardo Villarosa in Milan, Italy.

The Pratt knot is unusual in that its starting position is 'reverse side out', like the Nicky knot, a self-releasing variant of the Pratt. It uses less length than the half-Windsor or Windsor knots, and so is well suited to shorter ties or taller men. Unlike the four-in-hand knot, the Pratt method produces a symmetrical knot. It is of medium thickness.

Using notation from and according to The 85 Ways to Tie a Tie, the knot is tied
 Lo Ci Lo Ri Co T (knot 5)

The Nicky is tied
 Lo Ci Ro Li Co T (knot 4)

See also 
 List of knots

References

External links 
 Encyclopedia of tie knots at Thomas Fink's homepage
 
 Pratt (Shelby) tying guide at TieGuide.com
 

Necktie knots